Patrick Sarsfield Casserly (1792 – 30 April 1847) was an Irish scholar, editor and educator.

Biography
Casserly was born in Mullingar, County Westmeath, Ireland, to Patrick Casserly and Elizabeth Horan. His family was a branch of the O'Connors. He emigrated to the United States in 1824, settling in New York City, where he became one of the first Roman Catholic educators.

He was associate editor of the New York Weekly Register. He translated the "Sublime and Beautiful" of Longinus, and "Of the Little Garden of Roses and Valley of Lillies" of Thomas à Kempis; edited Jacob's Greek Reader (1836), of which sixteen editions were published, and a textbook on Latin Prosody (1845), which is still extensively used in classical schools, and wrote and published a pamphlet entitled New England Critics and New York Editors, in reply to an article in the North American Review on the merits of certain Greek textbooks.

He was the father of U.S. Senator Eugene Casserly.

Casserly died at his home in New York City after a brief illness.

References

External links 
 
 
 
 

People from Mullingar
Irish educators
Irish translators
People from County Westmeath
19th-century Irish writers
Irish emigrants to the United States (before 1923)
Date of birth unknown
1847 deaths
1792 births
19th-century translators